Bela minuta is a species of sea snail, a marine gastropod mollusk in the family Mangeliidae.

The name of this species is considered a nomen dubium

Description
The length of the shell attains 5 mm.

The reddish brown shell is strongly ribbed and distantly spirally striate.

Distribution
This species occurs in the Aegean Sea.

References

 van Aartsen J. J. (1988). Nomenclatural notes 7. Forbes' Aegean Turridae. Bollettino Malacologico 24 (5-8): 141-144

minuta